AFL Canberra is the name of the local governing body for and premier competition of Australian rules football in the Australian Capital Territory (and the Southern Tablelands of New South Wales).

It acts as an umbrella to several competitions beneath it. These competitions are Seniors First Grade, Seniors Second Grade, Thirds, Fourths and a Rising Stars League. A women's league, the Australian Capital Territory Women's Australian Football League operates separately though most AFL Canberra clubs also field women's teams.

History

The league was founded as the Federal Territory Australian Rules Football League in 1924 with founding members Acton and Queanbeyan. The following year, the premiership was contested by 4 clubs including Canberra, Federal and Duntroon. By 1926 the competition had gained popularity and was contested by 5 clubs.

AFL Canberra was once a very popular local league, however since the introduction of the Swans and matches featuring AFL clubs being played at Manuka Oval, the league's home ground, and the growth of local rugby union, rugby league and association football competitions, AFL Canberra has experienced the loss of clubs and spectator support.

In November 2010 the five AFL Canberra Premier Division clubs merged with the Premier Division clubs of the Queensland Australian Football League to form the North East Australian Football League. From 2011 onwards, the AFL Canberra Premier Division together with the reserve sides from the Sydney Swans and Greater Western Sydney Giants will form the NEAFL Eastern Conference. However the NEAFL was later dissolved due primarily to the COVID pandemic and associated financial pressures.

Names

The AFL Canberra has been through a number of forms.

 1924–1926 Federal Territory Australian Rules Football League (FTARFL);
 1927–1974 as the Canberra Australian National Football League (CANFL);
 1975–1999 Australian Capital Territory Australian Football League (ACTAFL);
 2000–2010 AFL Canberra
 2011–2020 North East Australian  League - Eastern Conference
 2011–present AFL Canberra Leagues

AFL Canberra Men's clubs

First & Second Grade and Under 18s Clubs

Lower Grade Clubs

AFL Canberra Women's Club

First Grade

Community League

Past clubs

Men's Grand Finals

First Grade

Team Performance

Second Grade

Team Performance

Third Grade

Team Performance

Fourth Grade

Team Performance

Regional League

Team Performance

Under 18s

Team Performance

Women's Grand Finals

First Grade

Team Performance

Community League

Team Performance

Regional League

Team Performance

Under 18s

Team Performance

See also
 Mulrooney Medal
 List of Australian rules football leagues in Australia

References

External links 
 

 
Australian rules football governing bodies
Australian rules football competitions in the Australian Capital Territory
Sports organizations established in 1924